Vanier-Les Rivières is a provincial electoral district in the Capitale-Nationale region of Quebec, Canada, that elects members to the National Assembly of Quebec.  It consists of the entire territory of the Les Rivières borough of Quebec City.

It was created for the 2012 election from a light modification to the former Vanier electoral district.

Members of the National Assembly

Election results

References

External links
Information
 Elections Quebec

Maps
 2011 map (PDF)
2001–2011 changes to Vanier (Flash)
 Electoral map of Capitale-Nationale region
 Quebec electoral map, 2011

Provincial electoral districts of Quebec City
Quebec provincial electoral districts